The 1996–97 Copa Federación de España was the fourth edition of the Copa Federación de España in its modern format, a knockout competition for Spanish football clubs.

Regional tournaments

Asturias tournament

Source:

Castile and León tournament

|}

National stage

Preliminary round

|}

First round

|}

Second round

|}

Semi-finals

|}

Final

|}

References

External links
CyL tournament results at AupaBurgos
Copa Federación at ElDeportivo.es

Copa Federación de España seasons
Fed
copa